Brigid or Brigit (meaning 'exalted one'), also Bríg, is a goddess of pre-Christian Ireland. She appears in Irish mythology as a member of the Tuatha Dé Danann, the daughter of the Dagda and wife of Bres, with whom she had a son named Ruadán.

She is associated with wisdom, poetry, healing, protection, smithing and domesticated animals. Cormac's Glossary, written in the 9th century by Christian monks, says that Brigid was "the goddess whom poets adored" and that she had two sisters: Brigid the healer and Brigid the smith. This suggests she may have been a triple deity. She is also thought to have some relation to the British Celtic goddess Brigantia.

Saint Brigid shares many of the goddess's attributes and her feast day, 1 February, was originally a pagan festival called Imbolc. It has thus been argued that the saint is a Christianization of the goddess, or that the lore of the goddess was transferred to her.

In early Irish literature
Cormac's Glossary, written by Christian scribes in the 9th century and based on earlier sources, says that Brigit was a goddess and daughter of the Dagda. It describes her as a "goddess of poets" and "woman of wisdom" or sage, who is also famous for her "protecting care". It says that Brigit has two sisters: Brigit the physician or "woman of healing", and Brigit the smith. It explains that from these, all goddesses in Ireland are called Brigit; suggesting that it "may have been more of a title than a personal name".

The Lebor Gabála Érenn also calls Brigit a poetess and daughter of the Dagda. It says she has two oxen, Fea and Femen, from whom are named Mag Fea (the plain of the River Barrow) and Mag Femin (the plain of the River Suir). Elsewhere, these are named as the two oxen of Dil, "radiant of beauty," which may have been a byname for Brigid.  It also says she possesses the "king of boars", Torc Triath (from whom the plain of Treithirne is named), and the "king of wethers", Cirb (from whom the plain of Cirb is named). The animals were said to cry out whenever plundering was committed in Ireland. This suggests Brigid was a guardian goddess of domesticated animals. 

In Cath Maige Tuired, Bríg is the wife of Bres and bears him a son, Ruadán. His name is cognate to several words in Indo-European languages that mean "red, rust", etc. The story says she began the custom of keening, a combination of wailing and singing, while mourning the death of Ruadán. She is credited in the same passage with inventing a whistle used for night travel.

In her English retellings of Irish myth, Lady Augusta Gregory describes Brigit as "a woman of poetry, and poets worshipped her, for her sway was very great and very noble.  And she was a woman of healing along with that, and a woman of smith's work, and it was she first made the whistle for calling one to another through the night."

Brigid and Saint Brigid

Historians suggest that the goddess Brigid was syncretized with the Christian saint of the same name. According to medievalist Pamela Berger, Christian monks "took the ancient figure of the mother goddess and grafted her name and functions onto her Christian counterpart," Brigid of Kildare. 

The goddess and saint have many of the same associations. Saint Brigid is considered a patroness of healers, poets, blacksmiths, livestock and dairy workers, as well as serpents (in Scotland) and the arrival of spring. 

The saint's hagiographies "are mainly anecdotes and miracle stories, some of which are deeply rooted in Irish pagan folklore". Dáithí Ó hÓgáin wrote that the melding of pagan goddess and Christian saint can be seen in some of the saint's miracles, where she multiplies food, bestows cattle and sheep, controls the weather, and is linked with fire or thermal springs.

In the late 12th century, Gerald of Wales wrote that nineteen nuns took turns keeping a perpetual fire burning at Kildare in honour of Saint Brigid. He said this fire was kept burning since Brigid's time, and it is suggested it originally belonged to a temple of Brigit the goddess. The Roman goddess Vesta and the Greek goddess Hestia had perpetual fires tended by priestesses. According to Gerald, it was ringed by a hedge that no man was allowed to cross, lest he be cursed.

The saint is associated with many holy wells and clootie wells in Ireland and Britain, where small strips of cloth or ribbons are left as part of a healing ritual. Celtic healing goddesses, such as Sirona and Coventina, were often associated with sacred springs. 

Saint Brigid's Day is 1 February. It was originally Imbolc, the first day of spring in Irish tradition. Because Saint Brigid has been theorised as linked to the goddess Brigid, some associate the festival of Imbolc with the goddess.

Saint Brigid's Day or Imbolc is traditionally a time for weather prognostication:

Neo-Paganism 
Brigid is an important figure for some modern pagans, who emphasize her triple aspect. She is sometimes worshipped in conjunction with Lugh or Cernunnos.

Name
Old Irish Brigit  came to be spelled Briġid and Brighid  by the early modern Irish period. Since the spelling reform of 1948, this has been spelled Bríd . The earlier form gave rise to various forms in the languages of Europe, starting from the Medieval Latin Brigida, and from there to English Bridget, French Brigitte, Swedish Birgitta and Finnish Piritta.

The name comes from Proto-Celtic *Brigantī and means "the high one" or "the exalted one". It is cognate with the name of the ancient British goddess Brigantia, with whom Brigid is thought to have some relation. It is also cognate with the Old High German personal name Burgunt, and the Sanskrit word Bṛhatī (बृहती) "high", an epithet of the Hindu dawn goddess Ushas. The ultimate source is Proto-Indo-European *bʰr̥ǵʰéntih₂ (feminine form of *bʰérǵʰonts, "high"), derived from the root *bʰerǵʰ- ("to rise"). Xavier Delamarre, citing E. Campanile, suggests that Brigid could be a continuation of the Indo-European dawn goddess.

See also
 Brigid's cross
 List of Irish-language given names
 Saraswati
 Maman Brigitte
Perchta
Athena

References

Further reading
Bitel, Lisa M. 2001. St. Brigit of Ireland: From Virgin Saint to Fertility Goddess
 Catháin, Séamas Ó. “Hearth-Prayers and Other Traditions of Brigit: Celtic Goddess and Holy Woman.” The Journal of the Royal Society of Antiquaries of Ireland, vol. 122, 1992, pp. 12–34. JSTOR, www.jstor.org/stable/25509020. Accessed 7 May 2020.

External links

Brighid Goddess and Saint
Mary Jones's entry on Brigid
Sloinntireachd Bhride (Genealogy of Bride) from the Carmina Gadelica

Arts goddesses
Domestic and hearth deities
Fire goddesses
Health goddesses
Irish goddesses
Smithing goddesses
Triple goddesses
Tuatha Dé Danann
Water goddesses
Irish royal consorts
Wisdom goddesses
Women metalsmiths
Crafts goddesses
Celtic goddesses
Dawn goddesses